Judith Cowan is a Canadian academic and writer.

Judith Elaine Cowan was born in Sydney, Nova Scotia, and grew up in Toronto. She attended West Hill Collegiate Institute before studying at the University of Toronto, at York University and at the Université de Sherbrooke. She taught English language literature at the Université du Québec à Trois-Rivières.

She has translated poetry written by Quebec authors into English for the magazine Ellipse as well as translating other works by French authors. Her short stories have appeared in literary magazines such as Quarry, Queen's Quarterly, The Malahat Review, The Fiddlehead and The Antigonish Review and, in translation, in the magazines L'Atelier du roman, Liberté and XYZ.

 Selected works 
 Quartz and Mica, translated from Quartz et mica by Yolande Villemaire (1987), finalist for the John Glassco Translation Prize
 This Desert Now, translated from Le désert maintenant by Yves Préfontaine (1993)
 More Than Life Itself, short stories (1997), translated into French as Plus que la vie même (2000), received the 
 Gambler's Fallacy, short stories (2001), translated into French as La loi des grands nombres (2003), received the 
 Mirabel translated from Lignes aériennes by Pierre Nepveu (2004), received the Governor General's Award for French to English translation
 Meridian Line, translated from Origine des méridiens'' by Paul Bélanger (2011), finalist for the Governor General's Award for Translation

References 

Year of birth missing (living people)
Living people
Canadian women short story writers
Governor General's Award-winning translators
University of Toronto alumni
York University alumni
Université de Sherbrooke alumni
20th-century Canadian short story writers
21st-century Canadian short story writers
20th-century Canadian translators
21st-century Canadian women writers
20th-century Canadian women writers
Canadian women non-fiction writers